Haliliye is a district and second level municipality in Şanlıurfa Province, Turkey. According to Law act no 6360, all Turkish provinces with a population more than 750 000, will be a metropolitan municipality and the districts within the metropolitan municipalities  will be second level municipalities. The law also creates new districts within the provinces in addition to present districts. These changes will be effective by the local elections in 2014. On local elections of 31 March 2019, Mehmet Canpolat from the Justice and Development Party (AKP) was elected mayor. As Kaymakam Metin Esen was appointed. 

Thus after 2014 the present Şanlıurfa (Urfa) central district will be split into three. The eastern quarters of the city will be named Haliliye and the name Şanlıurfa will be reserved for the metropolitan municipality. (Haliliye refers to Halil İbrahim the Muslim pronunciation of Abraham whose tomb is believed to be in Şanlıurfa)

See also 

 Boydere, Şanlıurfa
 Göktepe, Şanlıurfa
 Kısas, Haliliye
 Konuklu, Şanlıurfa
 Ulubağ, Şanlıurfa
 Yeniköy, Şanlıurfa

References

Districts of Şanlıurfa Province
Şanlıurfa
Kurdish settlements in Turkey